James Morrison McGill (27 November 1946 – 25 March 2015) was a Scottish footballer, who played for a number of clubs during the 1960s and 1970s, including Arsenal, and Huddersfield Town.

Born in Partick, McGill started out at Possil Park before joining Arsenal in July 1965. He made his debut against Leeds United on 5 May 1966 (a match which coincidentally saw Arsenal's lowest-ever attendance at Highbury, of just 4,554) but could not break into the first team and left Arsenal in September 1967 with just 12 appearances to his name. He moved to Huddersfield Town, where he spent four seasons and won the Second Division title, and then another five seasons at Hull City where he was club captain. He then moved to Halifax Town and spent time on loan in the US and later played in Australia before returning to England where he finished his career at Frickley Athletic.

References

External links

1946 births
2015 deaths
Footballers from Glasgow
Scottish footballers
English Football League players
Association football midfielders
Arsenal F.C. players
Huddersfield Town A.F.C. players
Hull City A.F.C. players
Halifax Town A.F.C. players
Frickley Athletic F.C. players
People from Partick